Grautskåla Cirque is a cirque immediately north of The Altar in the Humboldt Mountains of Queen Maud Land, Antarctica. It was discovered and mapped from air photos by the Third German Antarctic Expedition, 1938–39. It was remapped by the Sixth Norwegian Antarctic Expedition, 1956–60, and named Grautskåla (the mash bowl) because of its appearance and association with nearby Schussel Cirque. It is a very cold place.

References

Cirques of Queen Maud Land
Humboldt Mountains (Antarctica)